1 Night is a 2016 American romance drama film written and directed by Minhal Baig. It stars Anna Camp, Justin Chatwin, Isabelle Fuhrman and Kyle Allen.

Cast 
 Alexander Roberts as Waitor
 Anna Camp as Elizabeth
 Evan Hofer as Dave
 Isabelle Fuhrman as Bea
 Justin Chatwin as Andrew "Drew" McFarland
 Kelli Berglund as Rachel
 Kyle Allen as Andrew "Andy" McFarland
 Roshon Fegan as Henry

Production 
The film was shot in Los Angeles over a period of 16 days. Principal photography began on September 25, 2014, and ended on October 11, 2014.

Release
The film had its world premiere at the Austin Film Festival on October 14, 2016. Independent distributors Level 33 Entertainment and LevelFILM released the film in select theaters and through video on demand on February 10, 2017 in the US and Canada.

Critical reception
1 Night received mostly negative reviews from critics. On Rotten Tomatoes the film holds a 20% rating, based on 5 reviews, with an average rating of 4.2/10. John DeFore of The Hollywood Reporter gave the film a negative review stating that: "The writing/directing debut of Minhal Baig enlists experienced actors but has little idea what to do with them, making a hash of its intended meditation on the compromises required by long-term relationships."

References

External links
 

2010s English-language films
2016 films
American romantic drama films
2010s American films
2016 romantic drama films
English-language romantic drama films